Artur Crăciun (born 29 June 1998) is a Moldovan professional footballer who plays for Hapoel Kfar Saba, and the Moldova national team, as a defender.

Club career
Crăciun made his professional debut for Zimbru in the Divizia Națională on 20 May 2016 against Academia Chișinău, coming on as a 92nd-minute substitute.

On 23 July 2019 he signed a contract with Romanian Liga II side Universitatea Cluj.

On 10 March 2021, he was loaned out to Sfântul Gheorghe from Budapest Honvéd.

International career
He made his debut for Moldova national football team on 14 November 2019 in a Euro 2020 qualifier against France. He started the game and played the whole match.

Notes

References

External links

https://www.farulconstanta.com/echipa/fc-viitorul/jucatori/kevin-luckassen
https://www.uefa.com/uefanationsleague/teams/players/250105892--artur-craciun/?_preview_token_uefacom=covid_guidance_token%2Ccovid_guidance_token%2Ccovid_guidance_token
https://www.whoscored.com/Players/387953/Fixtures/Artur-Craciun

1998 births
Living people
Footballers from Chișinău
Moldovan footballers
Moldova youth international footballers
Moldova under-21 international footballers
Moldova international footballers
Association football defenders
Moldovan Super Liga players
FC Zimbru Chișinău players
FC Sheriff Tiraspol players
FC Milsami Orhei players
FC Universitatea Cluj players
Budapest Honvéd FC players
FC Sfîntul Gheorghe players
PFC Lokomotiv Plovdiv players
FC Tsarsko Selo Sofia players
Hapoel Kfar Saba F.C. players
Liga II players
Nemzeti Bajnokság I players
First Professional Football League (Bulgaria) players
Liga Leumit players
Moldovan expatriate footballers
Expatriate footballers in Romania
Expatriate footballers in Hungary
Expatriate footballers in Bulgaria
Expatriate footballers in Israel
Moldovan expatriate sportspeople in Romania
Moldovan expatriate sportspeople in Hungary
Moldovan expatriate sportspeople in Bulgaria
Moldovan expatriate sportspeople in Israel